The Springfield model 1884 was one of the "Trapdoor Springfield" rifles. It was an improved replacement for the previous longarm of the U.S. Armed Forces, the Springfield model 1873.

Description
The model 1884 traces its roots back to the design of the Springfield 1873. The model 1884 incorporated a significant number of improvements that had been made between 1878 and 1879. It also featured a serrated trigger that had been incorporated into the Springfield rifle design in 1883.

The most dramatic change to the rifle design, which is often considered to be the identifying feature of the model 1884, was a new rear sight which had been designed by Lieutenant Colonel Adelbert R. Buffington of the U.S. Army Ordnance Department. This sight however was not perfected until 1885.

The principal feature of this new sight was a rack and pinion style windage adjustment. Unlike previous sights, the base was not used for any position other than point blank. The raised leaf had graduations from 200 to 1400 yards. A new barrel band was also designed to accommodate this new sight so that it could lie flat in the point blank position.

Marksmen generally favored the new sight, but general troops were less enthusiastic about it and often considered it to be an annoyance.

The model 1884 was also produced in a carbine version. It was found that the rear sight could be easily damaged when removing the rifle from the carbine boot. The rear barrel band was therefore modified in 1890 to include a rear sight protector.

A round-rod bayonet model was also produced, designated the Model 1888. This, like the Springfield model 1880, was an attempt to combine the cleaning rod and bayonet into a single unit. The Model 1888 included an improved retaining mechanism, as the Model 1880's retaining mechanism had proved to be problematic.

See also
 Springfield rifle

References

Early rifles
Rifles of the United States
Hinged breechblock rifles
Springfield firearms